Mansfield Christian School is a private K-12 Christian school in Mansfield, Ohio, United States.

History 
In the fall of 1962 Mansfield Christian School began in the lower level of Marion Avenue Grace Brethren Church. The school started with thirty-five students and three faculty members. For a little over two years, the school operated at this location. These first parents and staff members held to the conviction that parents have been given the responsibility by God to teach and train their children. They also held to the principle that education should result from a Biblical philosophy and the next generation should be taught a Christian worldview.

In the fall of 1963 the school was moved to the current facilities located on Logan Road. A gift of  allowed the school to build its first building. In subsequent years, the school experienced four building expansions that included additional classrooms, a gymnasium, athletic fields, and a student-run radio station, WVMC-FM. By 1972 the first graduating class with nineteen students received their diplomas.

Athletics 
The Mansfield Christian Flames are members of the Mid-Buckeye Conference, beginning in 2013.

The Flames compete in the following sports:

Ohio High School Athletic Association State Championships

 Boys Soccer - 2014

References

External links
 Mansfield Christian School homepage

Buildings and structures in Mansfield, Ohio
Christian schools in Ohio
Education in Richland County, Ohio
High schools in Richland County, Ohio
Educational institutions established in 1962
1962 establishments in Ohio